The 1947–48 National Football League was the 17th staging of the National Football League, an annual Gaelic football tournament for the Gaelic Athletic Association county teams of Ireland.

At one game in Tralee on 9 November 1947,  managed to hold  to a draw despite having to draft in the county secretary and a car driver in as substitutes. The players drafted an official letter of complaint to the County Board.

Cavan won their first and, so far, only league title, winning the replay by 10 points.

Format

Divisions
There were four Sections or Divisions. Division winners played off for the NFL title. Teams were placed in the divisions along geographical lines:
Division One: Western
Division Two: Eastern
Division Three: Southern
Division Four: Northern. The Northern Division doubled as the Dr Lagan Cup. The winners qualified for the semi-finals.

Round-robin format
Each team played every other team in its division (or group where the division is split) once, either home or away.

Points awarded
2 points were awarded for a win and 1 for a draw.

Titles
Teams in all three divisions competed for the National Football League title.

Separation of teams on equal points

In the event that teams finish on equal points, then a play-off will be used to determine group placings if necessary.

Promotion and relegation
None. All four Divisions had equal status.

Group stage

Division One

Group A Results

Group B Results

Division Final

Tables

Group A

Group B

Division Two

Group A

Group B

Division Final

Tables

Group A

Group B

Division Three

Group A Results

Group B Results

Group C Results

Division play-offs

Tables

Group A

Group B

Group C

The Laois v Offaly fixture was not fulfilled.

Division Four (Dr Lagan Cup)

Knockout phase

Semi-final

Final

References

National Football League
National Football League
National Football League (Ireland) seasons